Alexamenus of Teos (5th century BC?) was one of the potential inventors of Greek literary genre of prose dialogue. Also known as Alexamenus of Tenos or Alexamenus of Styra, the only surviving news about him have been handed down, centuries later, by three sources: Athenaeus of Naucratis, Diogenes Laërtius and a papyrus from Oxyrhynchus.

Atheneus (XI 550c) reports the dual testimony of Nicias of Nicaea and Sotion, according to which Aristotle, in the lost work On the Poets (Περὶ ποιητῶν), gave Alexamenus chronological priority in the invention of dialogue:

«And his encomium (sc. of Menon) is uttered by him who despised others on the whole (sc. Plato), by banishing Homer and imitative poetry in the Republic, even though he himself had written dialogues in mimetic form, of whose form he is not even the inventor. In fact before him Alexamenus of Teos invented this kind of speeches, as witnessed by Nicias of Nicaea and Sotion. Aristotle then, in his work On the Poets, writes thus: “Then, do we not say that the so-called mimes of Sophron, written in verse, are speeches and imitations, or that those [the writings?] of Alexamenus of Teos, written first among [or: before] the Socratic dialogues, are so?”, thus asserting, that great sage Aristotle, that some dialogues were composed before Plato».

It is unclear whether the priority refers to Socratic dialogues or to dialogue in general. Some scholars accept this testimony in the form preserved by manuscripts, according to which Alexamenus wrote the first (πρώτους) among the Socratic dialogues. Others propose to correct πρώτους to προτέρους or πρότερον, altering the meaning: Alexamenus would not be the inventor of the Socratic dialogues, but a precursor.

Aristotelian opinion is critically witnessed by Diogenes Laërtius (III 48), who also finds mention of it in Favorinus:

«So they say that the first to write dialogues was the Eleatic Zeno; but Aristotle, in the first book of On the Poets, [says that he was] Alexamenus of Styra or Teos, as Favorinus also [says] in the Memoirs. But it seems to me that Plato, having perfected the literary genre, would rightly hold the primacy, as of beauty, so also of invention».

The writer of the papyrus of Oxyrhynchus (P. Oxy. 45 3219), which probably contains a treatise on Plato and the dialogue, confirms the news, but takes an anti-Aristotelian position and states that the main influence on Plato comes from the Sicilian mimographer Sophron:

«...in this also imitating Sophron, the writer of mimes, for the dramatic quality of the dialogues. For one should not believe Aristotle, who, out of jealous spite towards Plato, says in the first book of On poetry [= On the Poets] that even before Plato dramatic dialogues had been written by Alexamenos of Tenos»

Aristotle's view is therefore differently evaluated. However, if we believe his testimony, it seems that the literature of Alexamenos, whatever attributes it had, is comparable to the mimes of Sophron, of which little survived anyway. The basic question is: should we assume that Alexamenus was the first Socratic to have composed in a new literary genre, or that he was an earlier dialogue writer and uncoupled from Socratics and Socratic literature?,

Two suggestions, absolutely speculative.
	
First, one could perhaps compare the previous fragment of On the Poets with the well-known passage in Aristotle's On poetry, 1449b:

(On the Poets) «οὐκοῦν οὐδὲ ἐμμέτρους τοὺς καλουμένους Σώφρονος μίμους μὴ φῶμεν εἶναι λόγους καὶ μιμήσεις, ἢ τοὺς Ἀλεξαμενοῦ τοῦ Τήιου τοὺς πρώτους [or: προτέρους/πρότερον] γραφέντας τῶν Σωξρατικῶν διαλόγων»

«Then, do we not say that the so-called mimes of Sophron, written in verse, are speeches and imitations, or that those [the writings?] of Alexamenus of Teos, written first among [or: before] the Socratic dialogues, are so?»

(On poetry) «Οὐδὲν γὰρ ἂν ἔχοιμεν ὀνομάσαι κοινὸν τοὺς Σώφρονος καὶ Ξενάρχου μίμους καὶ τοὺς Σωρατικοὺς λόγους»

«Indeed, we would have no common name for the mimes of Sophron and Xenarchos and for the Socratic speeches»

In both texts the pair mimes - Socratic discourses/dialogues is compared. The name of Xenarchos, related to the group mimes, is implied in On the Poets and expressed in On poetry: conversely, the name of Alexamenus, related to the group Socratic discourses / dialogues, could be expressed in On the Poets and implied in On poetry. Moreover, manuscript tradition of Atheneus, which transmits the fragment of On the Poets, suggests that Alexamenus is author of the first among the Socratic writings. So, against Atheneus's proposed corrections of the text, it would perhaps be more economical to assume that Aristotle classifies Alexamenus within the group Socratic discourses/dialogues, and not as a pre-Socratic, in the same way that he places Xenarchos in the group mimes. If Aristotle is telling the truth, Alexamenus would be the first writer of Socratic discourses / dialogues and obviously would have known Socrates in person.

Secondly, assuming the previous hypothesis is true, the question might be asked: what were the writings of Alexamenos like? Clearly there is no verifiable evidence. Perhaps his activity took a form similar to that of the other authors of Socratic writings. According to Diogenes Laërtius (II 122–123), the mysterious Athenian Simon the Shoemaker used to take note of what he remembered of conversations between Socrates and some interlocutor ([Σωκράτους] διαλεγομένου τινά, ὧν ἐμνημόνευεν ὑποσημειώσεις ἐποιεῖτο). According then to Plato's Theethetus (142a1-143c8), the character Euclid, after witnessing the dialogue between Socrates and Theetetus, urgently writes some first notes (ὑπομνήματα), later returns with greater ease to his work through an effort of memory, then seizes every subsequent opportunity to meet with Socrates to correct his mistakes and thus makes the Socratic conversations known to Terpsion. Still according to Diogenes Laërtius (II 48), Xenophon was the first to publish the notes jotted down in the presence of Socrates (πρῶτος ὑποσημειωσάμενος τὰ λεγόμενα εἰς ἀνθρώπους ἤγαγεν), writing ἀπομνημονεύματα. The work of Alexamenus may fit within the scope of this type of practice.

See also

References

Classical Greek philosophers